Millie Turner (born 7 July 1996) is an English footballer who plays as a defender for Women's Super League club Manchester United.

She has previously played for Everton and Bristol City, and has been capped by England at youth level.

Club career

Early career 
Millie grew up in Wilmslow with older brother Bruce and younger brother Jake, now a professional goalkeeper with Gillingham. At the age of 10 she began playing with Stockport County before moving to Manchester City and then Crewe Alexandra's highly regarded youth setup. When Crewe's Centre of Excellence folded she drew offers from both Merseyside giants Liverpool and Everton but turned them down in favour of Manchester United.

Everton 
Turner joined Everton midway through the 2013 season and linked up with the development squad. She signed her first senior contract ahead of the 2014 season and made her league debut in a 2–0 defeat to Notts County on 20 April. She made a further five league appearances in her inaugural season, as well as two appearances in the FA WSL Cup.

On 1 June, Turner featured in the Women's FA Cup Final as Everton lost 2–0 to Arsenal at Stadium MK.

Bristol City 
In January 2017, Turner joined Bristol City ahead of the FA WSL Spring Series. She made her debut in a 3–1 defeat to Reading on 22 April and went on to play in a further seven games that season.

Turner was named captain ahead of the 2017–18 FA WSL campaign and scored her first goal for the club in a 2–1 loss to Chelsea in the FA WSL Cup on 4 November. She scored her first league goal in a 6–1 defeat to Manchester City on 3 May 2018.

Manchester United 
 
On 1 July 2018, Turner joined the newly-formed Manchester United to compete in the FA Women's Championship, reuniting with manager Willie Kirk who had been appointed assistant manager at United. She was one of seven players to return to the senior side having played for the club at youth level. She made her debut for the club in a 1–0 FA WSL Cup win over Liverpool on 19 August, and her league debut three weeks later in a 12–0 victory at Aston Villa. On 23 September, Turner scored her first goal for the club during a 5–0 win against London Bees.

Turner missed the second half of the 2021–22 season after being diagnosed with a carotid artery dissection, forcing her to stop all physical activity. She was able to resume training ahead of the 2022–23 season and made her first appearance since her diagnosis starting in United's opening day WSL victory over Reading.

International career

Youth
In February 2014, Turner was named in the England under-19 for the 2014 La Manga Tournament in March. In July 2015, she was named in the England under-19 squad for the UEFA Women's Under-19 Championship in Israel. England finished bottom of group B and did not progress.

Senior
In September 2020, Turner received her first senior national team call-up as part of a 30-player training camp at St George's Park.

Career statistics

Club

Honours
Manchester United
 FA Women's Championship: 2018–19

References

External links 
 Profile at the Manchester United F.C. website
 Profile at the Football Association website
 
 

1996 births
Living people
English women's footballers
Women's association football defenders
Women's Super League players
Everton F.C. (women) players
Bristol City W.F.C. players
Manchester United W.F.C. players